Lindsdals IF is a Swedish football club located just outside Kalmar in Småland. The club's major sport is football but table tennis is also available.

Background
Since their foundation on 26 July 1926 Lindsdals IF has participated mainly in the middle and lower divisions of the Swedish football league system.  The club currently plays in Division 2 Södra Götaland which is the fourth tier of Swedish football. They play their home matches at the Fjölebro IP in Kalmar.

Thanks to a partnership with Kalmar FF the club hope to be able to take further strides up the league system.  Lindsdals IF run a large number of teams with approximately 400 young people active in both boys and girls' teams.  The club's ladies team competed in the Damallsvenskan for several years in the 1990s. Their most famous player was Cecilia Sandell who later became an international. English World Cup players Tina Mapes and Karen Farley also played for the club.

Lindsdals IF are affiliated to the Smålands Fotbollförbund.

Season to season

Footnotes

External links
 Lindsdals IF – Official club website
 Lindsdals IF – Football website

Football clubs in Kalmar County
Association football clubs established in 1926
1926 establishments in Sweden